Sierra Nizhoni Teller Ornelas (born 1981) (Navajo) is an American showrunner, screenwriter, filmmaker and weaver from Tucson, Arizona. She is one of three co-creators of the scripted NBC (Peacock) comedy series Rutherford Falls, alongside Ed Helms and Mike Schur.

Known for writing and production work on shows such as Brooklyn Nine-Nine, Happy Endings, Splitting Up Together, and Superstore, Ornelas has also written and contributed to This American Life and the New York Times. In 2019 Ornelas signed a multi-year development deal with Universal Television, beginning with the Peacock sitcom Rutherford Falls.

Early life and education
Ornelas is from Tucson, Arizona. She is Navajo, born to the Edge Water clan. Her maternal grandfather is Water Flowing Together clan and her paternal grandfather is Mexican clan. 

Ornelas knew as early as second grade that she wanted to write for television. She attended the University of Arizona, where she studied media arts.

Career
After graduating from college, Teller Ornelas worked for five years as a film programmer at the National Museum of the American Indian in Washington, D.C. She was inspired to leave that job and pursue her dreams of becoming a television writer by a "big swing" her mother and aunt had made in the 1980s when they spent four years weaving an enormous rug. They sold it for $60,000, which changed their family's lives. 

Ornelas applied to and was selected in 2010 for the Disney/ABC Television Group's diversity writing program. After this, she gained a position as a staff writer on Happy Endings. She contributed to a sub-plot in which Dave, played by Zachary Knighton, discovers he is one-sixteenth Navajo and begins playing into stereotypes about Native Americans. Ornelas said in a 2011 interview with the Navajo Times that if done right, comedy can be a way to "get conversation going about very dense, complicated issues."

Ornelas is committed to gaining diversity in writers' rooms and the media. She, Ed Helms, and Mike Schur were co-creators of the series Rutherford Falls, which presented its first episode on NBC in 2021. As showrunner, Ornelas oversees a writers room that includes four other Indigenous writers – Tazbah Chavez, Tai Leclaire, Jana Schmieding, and Bobby Wilson. Having five indigenous writers for a series is believed to be a first for a major television production. Her overall deal with Universal Television was renewed in August 2021.

In addition to writing and producing, Ornelas is a sixth-generation Navajo weaver. She was commissioned by the Arizona State Museum to make a documentary film, A Loom with a View: Modern Navajo Weavers, which explores the weaving of family members: mother Barbara Teller Ornelas; aunt, Margaret Yazzie; and brother, Micheal Teller Ornelas.

References

External links

Navajo people
American television writers
Writers from Tucson, Arizona
American television producers
1981 births
Living people
American women television writers
American women television producers
21st-century American screenwriters
21st-century American women writers
University of Arizona alumni
Native American women writers
Native American screenwriters
Native American filmmakers
Showrunners
20th-century Native Americans
21st-century Native Americans
20th-century Native American women
21st-century Native American women